Paavo Olavi Vallius (born 1949) is a Swedish politician and former member of the Riksdag, the national legislature. A member of the Social Democratic Party, he represented Västmanland County between October 1994 and October 1998; and between October 2002 and October 2006. He was also a substitute member of the Riksdag for Lena Hjelm-Wallén between October 1998 and September 2002. He is a Swedish Finn.

References

1949 births
Living people
Members of the Riksdag 1994–1998
Members of the Riksdag 2002–2006
Members of the Riksdag from the Social Democrats
Swedish people of Finnish descent